Havelterberg is a village in the Dutch province of Drenthe. It lies on the border of the municipalities Meppel and Westerveld, and lies about 21 km west of Hoogeveen.

History 
The village was first mentioned in 1844 as Havelterberg, and means "hill belonging to Havelte. The name is used both for the village and the hill. Havelterberg has place name signs.

Between 1964 and 1989, there was an American military base at Havelterberg. It contained munition depot of NATO. Only the watchtower has remained. It used to be the site of frequent anti-nuclear demonstrations, because tactical nuclear weapons were suspected to be present at the base.

Dolmen 

There are two hunebedden (dolmen) in Havelterberg.  is the second largest dolmen of the Netherlands. It used to have a beautiful ring of 40 stones. There were still 24 left in 1918 when Albert Egges van Giffen researched the dolmen. Nowadays, there are only 10 left. All the stones have been put back in there place in 1918. The cellar contained the largest amount of artefacts of any dolmen. In 1945, the German authorities wanted to remove the stones, because it was a clear marker for enemy aircraft. Van Giffen persuaded the Germans to bury the stones, and there were placed back in their original position in 1949.

 is located nearby and they can almost be considered twins. There are six capstones, however one is missing.

Gallery

References

Populated places in Drenthe
Westerveld
Meppel